The R110B (contract order R131) was a prototype class of experimental New Technology Train (NTT) New York City Subway cars built by Bombardier of Canada for service on the B Division services. There were nine cars, arranged as three-car sets. They were designed to test features that would be implemented on future mass-production NTT orders.

First announced in 1989, the R110Bs were delivered in 1992 and entered service on June 15, 1993, on the  service. An explosion in 1996 forced three cars to be taken out of service, resulting in the remaining six cars to run on the  service. The six cars not affected by the explosion continued to run until 2000, when they were permanently removed from service due to frequent breakdowns and low Mean Distance Between Failure (MDBF) numbers. Five of the nine cars were sent away to various facilities, with the remaining four still on MTA property.

Description
The R110B cars were ordered from Bombardier in December 1989. The R110B was designed to test various new technology features that would eventually be incorporated into the R143 and were not intended for long-term production use.

There were nine R110B cars, numbered 3001–3009. The cars were linked into three-car sets by consecutive numbers. The cab cars are powered with four traction motors each, while the center car of the 3-car set is an un-powered, cab-less trailer. The cars are typical B-Division size, except that they are 67 feet long, a length shared by the BMT Standards and the SIRT ME-1, along with all of the SEPTA's Broad Street Subway cars and the current PATCO fleets.

The R110B uses the standard subway train control stand, but with some added computerized features. The layout of the controls is desk-style, with switches, lamps, and a single lever to control traction and braking. A CRT with function keys on either side is used to monitor speed, train status, etc.

The R110B's design is similar to that of the R68 cars now in use on the BMT and IND services, but the ends are more square and use Lexan glass in the windows. Car ends that do not have cabs have an expanse of glass. The seating configuration is the same as in the R68, but the materials are more advanced. 

A matte plastic is used that allows scratches, tags, and stubborn graffiti to be buffed out using a light abrasive. The seats have a reduced bucket. Internal surfaces are tan fiberglass and plastic, with accents provided using a plastic mosaic applique. The floor uses linoleum with a pattern of slightly raised and textured squares. The R110B cars have handholds for shorter passengers.

There are rollsign line indicators in the front of the train, LCD destination signs (on windows) and interior strip route guides on top of the ad space, and an LED indication of stops ahead on both sides. Rollsigns were not used on the subsequent New Technology Train orders; however, the incoming R211 order will be equipped with front LED signs that are similar to rollsign-equipped trains.

Another new and important feature was the passenger intercom, which could be used for emergencies.

History
During the 1970s and 1980s, the Metropolitan Transportation Authority (MTA) had made several large orders for subway cars, such as the R46, which had new components added to them. However, because there was not a prototype built first for testing, many expensive retrofits were required. The MTA was in the process of creating the first technologically-advanced subway car since the R44 in the early 1970s. In order to avoid the aforementioned problem, in 1989, the MTA awarded contracts for two prototype test trains, one of which was the R110A (contract R130) for the A Division built by Kawasaki Heavy Industries, and the R110B (contract R131) for the B Division built by Bombardier Transportation.

These two fleets were called the New Technology Test Trains (NTTTs) and would test features that would be implemented on future mass-production orders, specifically the New Technology Trains. The R110B tested new technology, including AC propulsion with regeneration, microprocessor-controlled doors and brakes, roof-mounted hermetic air-conditioning units, and fabricated trucks with air bags suspension. Passenger emergency intercoms for contacting train crews, passenger alarm strips to press in case of an emergency, improved lighting, glass to see into the next cars and the platform, and computerized announcements were all implemented.

The R110Bs entered service on June 15, 1993, running on the  train.

Incident
On November 4, 1996, a fire and explosion occurred on car 3006 while the train was in service on the  train. This resulted in set 3007–3009 being permanently taken out of service and cannibalized of parts to repair car 3006 and to keep the other two sets operating. The two remaining sets (3001–3003 and 3004–3006) ran as a six-car train on the  route.

Retirement and current status
Throughout 1999, the remaining R110Bs had been in and out of service for both repairs and additional component testing. The train was permanently removed from service in 2000 due to frequent breakdowns and low Mean Distance Between Failure (MDBF) numbers, and never ran in service again.

After retirement, many of the cars were reused throughout New York City, including:
 3001 – sent off to College Point, Queens in early 2014 for use as a training car for the NYPD. Part of the car was cut away to allow the car to fit in the building.
 3004 and 3006 – used as training cars at the Coney Island Yard's firefighting facility, since August 2004. These cars replaced R30s 8392 and 8401.
 3005 – used as a training car at P.S. 248, the New York City Transit Learning Center, since July 15, 2004. This car replaced R16 6452.
 3008 – spotted in late August 2015 near FDNY's Randall's Island training facility. This car may replace older cars there.

Cars 3002, 3003, 3007, and 3009 are currently stored at the 207th Street Yard. Plans are unknown for these cars.

References

Further reading 
 Sansone, Gene. Evolution of New York City subways: An illustrated history of New York City's transit cars, 1867-1997. New York Transit Museum Press, New York, 1997

External links 
 R110B at nycsubway.org

Train-related introductions in 1992
New York City Subway rolling stock
Bombardier Transportation multiple units
1992 in rail transport
Electric multiple units of the United States